The timeline below shows the history of the island Fiji, from the ancient times to the present day.

Early history

1822 to 1874

1875 to 1970

1972 to 2020

See also
List of heads of state of Fiji
List of prime ministers of Fiji
Politics of Fiji

External links 
 
 
 
Great Council of Chiefs – A Colonial Legacy Created to Protect The Supremacy of Bau | url= http://fijisun.com.fj/2015/09/29/the-politics-of-fiji-a-way-forward-for-itaukei-people/

 
Fiji